France national racquetball team represents the Fédération Française de Racquetball in racquetball international competitions. It is a member of the European Racquetball Federation and International Racquetball Federation.

History

Players
National team in the European Championship 2009

References

External links 
 FFR  Fédération Française de Racquetball

 

National racquetball teams
Racquetball
Racquetball in France